Ironmouse is a Puerto Rican-American VTuber, singer and live streamer. Active since 2017, she is a founding member of the VTuber group VShojo launched in 2020. With over one million followers on Twitch, she is the most-followed English language VTuber on the platform, and had the most active paid subscriptions of all Twitch channels for a period in February 2022. The name Ironmouse was inspired by a minor character from Sailor Moon.

Career
Ironmouse had originally planned to pursue a career as an opera singer, but was later diagnosed with common variable immunodeficiency (CVID)—an immune disorder that has left her largely bedridden. This has required her to remain isolated from others—a situation which intensified in 2020 amid the onset of the COVID-19 pandemic. In 2017, she began to pursue a career as a streamer instead, as she was "lonely and wanted something to do". Hesitant to use her real face online, she was inspired by the Japanese entertainer Kizuna AI—the first YouTuber to refer to themselves as a "virtual YouTuber"—to stream with a digital avatar to conceal her identity.

After discovering that there were a growing number of users referring to themselves as VTubers like Kizuna, she began to consider herself one. The Ironmouse persona was expanded into a character, which she referred to as a "bigger version of me" and being like a superhero costume; her avatar usually takes the form of a horned demon with pink and purple hair, while its backstory—influenced by her having jokingly referred to herself on-stream as such—suggests that the character is a personification of Satan itself. Ironmouse's distinctive, high-pitched speaking voice is the result of CVID complications; she has remarked that some people have refused to take her seriously because of her voice, and that some fellow streamers have been shocked to find out that it was her real voice, and not being manipulated with a voice changer.

Amid a growth trend for streamers in general, and especially VTubers, Ironmouse's audience on Twitch began to see increases over 2020 and 2021. The increasing revenue from her streams also allowed her to afford higher-quality health care. In turn, improvements to her condition enabled her to perform longer streams on a more regular basis. In November 2020, Ironmouse was announced as one of the charter members of VShojo, a new U.S.-based agency of English-language VTubers, joining other streamers and personalities such as Nyanners and Projekt Melody. She has also frequently collaborated with Welsh YouTuber CDawgVA, and has occasionally hosted a talk show—Speak of the Devil—which features various guests.

In February 2022, Ironmouse held a subathon event, a nonstop stream in which a countdown clock was extended whenever viewers purchased paid subscriptions or otherwise make donations to the channel. The stream remained online even when she was asleep, during which other content, such as videos, and appearances by her friends and other guests, were featured. Over the course of the event, which ran for a total of 31 days through March 7, 2022, Ironmouse became the most-subscribed to female streamer on Twitch, and had the largest number of active subscribers of all Twitch channels at the time (although short of an overall record set by Ludwig during a similar event he held in 2021), with nearly 172,000 subscribers in total by the end of the event.

According to data from StreamElements and Rainmaker, Ironmouse was the eighth-most watched streamer on Twitch during the month of February 2022—marking the first time that a VTuber had made their monthly top 10. Discussing the event, Ironmouse felt that it was "the only time I didn't feel lonely because I felt like I had somebody there all the time. It was the least lonely I've ever felt in a long time."

In December 2022, she was listed among the "heroes" on the Plasma Hero website for raising awareness about CVID and encouraging viewers to donate plasma. She has also received praise for encouraging donations to The Immune Deficiency Foundation (IDF), a charitable organization which helps people suffering from conditions like hers through research and improving the quality of life of people suffering from primary immunodeficiency. According to StreamsCharts, Ironmouse was the second most-watched female twitch streamer of 2022.

Discography

Live albums

Singles

Cover singles

Featured singles

Awards and nominations

See also
Internet celebrity

References

External links

American animation
Living people
Puerto Rican women
Twitch (service) streamers
American YouTubers
VShojo
Year of birth missing (living people)
Unidentified people
Fictional characters introduced in 2017